Marldon is a village in the South Hams in Devon, United Kingdom, to the north-west of Paignton. It is the most northeasterly Civil Parish in the South Hams and includes the village of Compton with Compton Castle. Beacon Hill transmitting station is on the highest point in the parish.

History
Church records date back to 1598. The parish was in the Haytor Hundred. Marldon was a small village until the 1960s when major residential development took place.

Marldon is known locally for its Apple Pie fair which originated in the nineteenth century and was revived in 1958.

Amenities
Marldon is an active community with many clubs and groups meeting regularly.

Two walking trails pass through the village:
 John Musgrave Heritage Trail, a 35-mile route around Torbay 
 Totnes-Torquay Trail

Notable former residents
Robert Adams (1810–1870), inventor of the double-action revolver
Gilberts of Compton, including the explorer Sir Humphrey Gilbert (1539-1583)
Elizabeth Goudge (1900–1984), writer. She lived at Westerland from 1939 to 1950. Some of her books are set in the area.
Ray Tolchard (1953–2004), cricketer and umpire

References

External links
Marldon GENUKI
Marldon local history group
Marldon Parish Council
Marldon village hall
St John the Baptist Church

Villages in South Hams
Civil parishes in South Hams